David John McKeough (December 1, 1863 – July 11, 1901) was a professional baseball catcher. He played two seasons in Major League Baseball, for the Rochester Broncos in 1890 and the Philadelphia Athletics in 1891.

References 

Major League Baseball catchers
Rochester Broncos players
Philadelphia Athletics (AA 1891) players
Utica Pent Ups players
Memphis Browns players
Memphis Grays players
Rochester Jingoes players
Buffalo Bisons (minor league) players
Rochester Flour Cities players
Providence Grays (minor league) players
Providence Clamdiggers (baseball) players
Baseball players from New York (state)
Sportspeople from Utica, New York
1863 births
1901 deaths